The 2017 LEB Oro playoffs is the final stage of the 2016–17 LEB Oro season. They will start on 5 May 2017 and will finish on 13 June if necessary.

All series will be played in a best-of-5 games format. The best seeded team plays at home the games 1, 2 and 5 if necessary. The winner of the finals will promote to the 2017–18 ACB season with RETAbet.es GBC, the champion of the regular season.

Bracket

Quarterfinals

Unión Financiera Baloncesto Oviedo v Ourense Provincia Termal

Cafés Candelas Breogán v Palma Air Europa

San Pablo Inmobiliaria Burgos v Club Melilla Baloncesto

Quesos Cerrato Palencia v Leyma Coruña

Semifinals

Unión Financiera Baloncesto Oviedo v Quesos Cerrato Palencia

Cafés Candelas Breogán v San Pablo Inmobiliaria Burgos

Finals

References

LEB Oro playoffs
playoff